Joseph McBride (born August 9, 1947) is an American film historian, biographer, screenwriter, author and educator. He has written numerous books including biographies of notable film directors, a book on screenwriting, an investigative journalism book on the JFK assassination, and a memoir of the dark years in his life.

He also serves as professor in the Cinema Department at San Francisco State University.

Career

Early life and career
Born in Milwaukee, Wisconsin, McBride grew up in the suburb of Wauwatosa.  He attended the University of Wisconsin, Madison, and worked as a reporter for the Wisconsin State Journal in Madison, before moving to California in 1973.

Books
McBride has published more than 20 books since 1968, including biographies of film directors Steven Spielberg (Steven Spielberg: A Biography, 1997, and published in translation in mainland China in 2012), Frank Capra (Frank Capra: The Catastrophe of Success, 1992), Orson Welles (Orson Welles (1972), Orson Welles: Actor and Director (1977) and What Ever Happened to Orson Welles?: A Portrait of an Independent Career (2006)), and John Ford (John Ford (with Michael Wilmington, 1974) and Searching for John Ford (2001)). McBride's interview book with Howard Hawks, Hawks on Hawks, was published in 1982.

In 2012, he published a screenwriting manual, Writing in Pictures: Screenwriting Made (Mostly) Painless. In the book, McBride uses his adaptation of Jack London’s short story "To Build a Fire" to break down the steps necessary for a screenplay, such as research, treatments, and outlines. The book draws from his extensive teaching experience.

In 2013, he published Into the Nightmare: My Search for the Killers of President John F. Kennedy and Officer J. D. Tippit, which was the result of McBride's 31-year investigation of the case. Later, in 2015, he published The Broken Places: A Memoir, which deals with his troubled childhood, his teenage breakdown, and his subsequent recovery.

Columbia University Press published How Did Lubitsch Do It?, McBride's look at the career of filmmaker Ernst Lubitsch, in June 2018. 

In March 2019, Frankly: Unmasking Frank Capra was published by McBride. It recounts his legal battle with original publisher Knopf/Random House and Capra allies over publication of the  biography Frank Capra: The Catastrophe of Success, which was published by Simon & Schuster in 1992. His biography of Billy Wilder, Billy Wilder: Dancing on the Edge was published in 2021.

Film and television
McBride's screenwriting credits include the movies Rock 'n' Roll High School and Blood and Guts and five American Film Institute Life Achievement Award specials on CBS-TV dealing with Fred Astaire, Frank Capra, Lillian Gish, John Huston, and James Stewart. He was also cowriter of the United States Information Agency worldwide live TV special Let Poland Be Poland (1982).

He plays a film critic, Mr. Pister, in the Orson Welles feature The Other Side of the Wind (1970–76) and served as a consultant on its completion in 2018.  He is also the coproducer of the documentaries Obsessed with "Vertigo": New Life for Hitchcock's Masterpiece (1997) and John Ford Goes to War (2002).

Awards and honors
McBride received the "Television: Comedy/Variety - Special" Writers Guild of America Award in 1984 for cowriting The American Film Institute Salute to John Huston with producer George Stevens, Jr.  He has also received four other WGA nominations, two Emmy nominations, and a Canadian Film Awards nomination. The French edition of Searching for John Ford, titled A la recherche de John Ford, published in 2007, was chosen the Best Foreign Film Book of the Year by the French film critics' association, le Syndicat Français de la Critique de Cinéma.

A documentary feature on his life and work, Behind the Curtain: Joseph McBride on Writing Film History, written and directed by Hart Perez, had its world debut in 2011 at the Tiburon International Film Festival in Tiburon, Marin County, CA, and was released on DVD in 2012.

Personal life
McBride lives in Berkeley, California. His life partner is author and psychology educator Ann Weiser Cornell.

Bibliography

As Author

 Orson Welles (1972, revised and expanded 1996)
 John Ford (1975, with Michael Wilmington)
 Kirk Douglas (1976)
 Orson Welles: Actor and Director (1977)
 High and Inside: An A-to-Z Guide to the Language of Baseball (1980)
 Hawks on Hawks (1982)
 Frank Capra: The Catastrophe of Success (1992)
 Steven Spielberg: A Biography (1997, revised and expanded 2012)
 The Book of Movie Lists: An Offbeat, Provocative Collection of the Best and Worst of Everything in Movies (1998)
 Searching for John Ford (2001)
 What Ever Happened to Orson Welles?: A Portrait of an Independent Career (2006, revised and expanded 2022)
 Writing in Pictures: Screenwriting Made (Mostly) Painless (2012)
 Into the Nightmare: My Search for the Killers of President John F. Kennedy and Officer J.D. Tippit (2013)
 The Broken Places: A Memoir (2015)
 Two Cheers for Hollywood: Joseph McBride on Movies (2017)
 How Did Lubitsch Do It? (2018)
 Frankly: Unmasking Frank Capra (2019)
 Billy Wilder: Dancing on the Edge (2021)
 Political Truth: The Media and the Assassination of President Kennedy (2022)
 The Whole Durn Human Comedy: Life According to the Coen Brothers (2022)

As Editor

 Persistence of Vision: A Collection of Film Criticism (1968)
 Focus on Howard Hawks (1972)
 Filmmakers on Filmmaking: The American Film Institute Seminars on Motion Pictures and Television, Volume 1 (1983)
 Filmmakers on Filmmaking: The American Film Institute Seminars on Motion Pictures and Television, Volume 2 (1983)

References

External links
Official site

Beatrice interview: Joseph McBride

1947 births
Living people
20th-century American biographers
20th-century American male writers
21st-century American biographers
21st-century American male writers
Screenwriting instructors
American conspiracy theorists
American film critics
American male screenwriters
American film historians
Film theorists
John F. Kennedy conspiracy theorists
Journalists from Wisconsin
People from Wauwatosa, Wisconsin
Researchers of the assassination of John F. Kennedy
San Francisco State University faculty
Screenwriters from California
Screenwriters from Wisconsin
University of Wisconsin–Madison alumni
Writers from Milwaukee
American male biographers